Professor Ilan Davis is a Wellcome Trust Senior Fellow and holds the chair of Cell Biology at the Department of Biochemistry, University of Oxford. Previously he was a group leader at the Wellcome Trust Centre for Cell Biology, University of Edinburgh. In 2011, he was elected as an EMBO fellow.

Research 
His work focuses on the mechanism of mRNA transport  and localised translation  in Drosophila. 
 
Davis holds a Wellcome Trust Senior Research Fellow grant, Wellcome Trust Strategic Award: Advanced Imaging for Chromosome and RNA Dynamics  and an MRC grant for Nanoscopy Oxford.

References

External links 
Lab web site 
 Micron & NanO

Year of birth missing (living people)
Living people
Fellows of Jesus College, Oxford